William Ormond (26 August 1926 – 1992) was a Scottish footballer who played as a left winger in the English Football League.

References

External links

1926 births
1992 deaths
Scottish footballers
Footballers from Greenock
Association football wingers
Partick Thistle F.C. players
Blackpool F.C. players
Oldham Athletic A.F.C. players
Barrow A.F.C. players
Scunthorpe United F.C. players
Weymouth F.C. players
English Football League players
Barnstaple Town F.C. players
Arthurlie F.C. players